Josselyn's Wife is a lost 1919 American silent drama film based on a novel by Kathleen Norris. It was directed by Howard C. Hickman and starred Bessie Barriscale, Nigel Barrie, and Joseph J. Dowling. The novel was refilmed again in 1926 with Pauline Frederick.

Plot
As described in a film magazine, Ellen Latimer Josselyn (Barriscale), after the birth of her son, influences her husband Gibbs (Barrie) to forget the quarrel he had with his father (Dowling) at the time his father took a much younger woman for his wife. A happy reunion follows and Mr. and Mrs. Gibbs Josselyn go to make their home his father and stepmother. Lillian, the young stepmother, has grown tired of her society friends and sets out to make Gibbs fall in love with her. A strange coincidence leads the younger Mrs. Josselyn and older Mr. Josselyn to believe Lillian and Gibbs have been untrue to them. A violent quarrel between Gibbs and his father follows. On the next morning the elder Josselyn is found dead from a bullet wound and Gibbs is arrested. After the trial has dragged several months, Tommy (Alexander), the little grandson, tells of how he was playing "spy" on his grandfather in the early morning hours and "the gun exploded and grandfather went to sleep." The story clears Gibbs and opens up a new and happier life for the parents and son.

Cast
Bessie Barriscale as Ellen Latimer Josselyn
Nigel Barrie as Gibbs Josselyn
Kathleen Kirkham as Lillian Josselyn
Joseph J. Dowling as Grandpa Latimer
Ben Alexander as Tommy Josselyn
Leslie Stuart as Lindsay Pepper
Marguerite De La Motte as Lizzie
Josephine Crowell as Aunt Elsie
George Hackathorne as Joe Latimer
Helen Dunbar as Mrs. Rose
Tom Guise as Thomas Josselyn

References

External links

Norris, Kathleen Thompson (1918), Josselyn's Wife, New York: Grosset & Dunlap, on the Internet Archive

1919 films
American silent feature films
Lost American films
Films directed by Howard C. Hickman
1919 drama films
Silent American drama films
American black-and-white films
Film Booking Offices of America films
1919 lost films
Lost drama films
1910s American films